Henry (or Henri) Wyn (1910 - 1989) was a Belgian composer and pianist.

Wyn composed the musical scores for at least two Belgian films and also recorded as a pianist with a group called "Henri Wyn et ses Rythmes".

Wyn's compositions were at least partly published by the music publishing company ""L’art belge", owned by composer Léon Frings.

Film 
 1936 - J'ai gagné un million
 1937 - Le roi soldat

References

External links 
  (as Henry Wyn)
  (as Henri Wyn)

Belgian composers
Male composers
Belgian pianists
1910 births
1989 deaths
20th-century Belgian people
20th-century pianists
20th-century Belgian male musicians